Algonquins of Barriere Lake are an Algonquin First Nation in Quebec, Canada. They primarily live on the Indian reserve of Rapid Lake in Outaouais. In 2017 the band had a registered population of 792 members. It is part of Algonquin Nation Programs and Services Secretariat.

Demographics
The members of the First Nation of Barriere Lake are Algonquin people. In March 2017 the band had a total registered population of 792 members, 166 of whom lived off reserve.

Geography
Algonquins of Barriere Lake live primarily on the Indian reserve of Rapid Lake, also called Lac-Rapide and Kitiganik, located 121 km northwest of Maniwaki in Outaouais, Quebec. The closest important cities are Val-d'Or and Rouyn-Noranda.

Government
Algonquins of Barriere Lake are governed by a band council elected according to the Section 11 of the Indian Act. For the 2016-2018 tenure, this council is composed of the chief Casey Ratt and six councillors. The band is affiliated with the tribal council Algonquin Nation Programs and Services Secretariat.

See also
Rapid Lake, Quebec
Algonquin people

References

External links
First Nation Detail by Indigenous and Northern Affairs Canada

Outaouais
First Nations governments in Quebec
Algonquin